The Bishop of Lewes is an episcopal title used by a suffragan bishop of the Church of England Diocese of Chichester, in the Province of Canterbury, England. The title takes its name after Lewes, the county town of East Sussex. The bishops suffragan of Lewes were area bishops since the Chichester area scheme was erected in 1984 until 2013. The suffragan bishop has oversight of the archdeaconries of Hastings & Brighton and Lewes.

The present bishop, since July 2020, is Will Hazlewood.

List of bishops

References

External links
 Crockford's Clerical Directory - Listings

 
Anglican suffragan bishops in the Diocese of Chichester